Hong Kong National Badminton Championships are held since 1937.

Past winners

External links
hkbadmintonassn.org.hk

National badminton championships
Badminton in Hong Kong
Recurring sporting events established in 1950
1950 establishments in Hong Kong
Sports competitions in Hong Kong